The 3 '''arrondissements of the Hautes-Pyrénées department are:
 Arrondissement of Argelès-Gazost, (subprefecture: Argelès-Gazost) with 87 communes.  The population of the arrondissement was 38,002 in 2016.  
 Arrondissement of Bagnères-de-Bigorre, (subprefecture: Bagnères-de-Bigorre) with 170 communes. The population of the arrondissement was 48,866 in 2016.  
 Arrondissement of Tarbes, (prefecture of the Hautes-Pyrénées department: Tarbes) with 212 communes.  The population of the arrondissement was 140,961 in 2016.

History

In 1800 the arrondissements of Tarbes, Argelès-Gazost and Bagnères-de-Bigorre were established. The arrondissement of Argelès-Gazost was disbanded in 1926, and restored in 1942. In January 2017 13 communes passed from the arrondissement of Tarbes to the arrondissement of Bagnères-de-Bigorre.

References

Hautes-Pyrenees